The Leela Group is an Indian business conglomerate founded by Chittarath Poovakkatt Krishnan Nair in 1981, and named after his wife. The hotel division, The Leela Palaces, Hotels and Resorts, is its most well known. It describes itself as involved in: "hotel and resort properties; IT and business parks; as well as, real estate development". Its headquarters are in India.

The company consists (at least) of the following divisions:
 Hotel Leelaventure Ltd.
 Leela Lace Holdings Pvt. Ltd.
 Leela Lace Software Solutions Pvt. Ltd
 Leela Fashions Pvt. Ltd.
 Leela Innovation Centre Pvt. Ltd.
 Leela Housing Pvt Ltd
 Leela Soft Pvt. Ltd.
 Leela Lace Estate Pvt. Ltd.
 Leela Villas Pvt. Ltd.
 Leela Lace Info Park Pvt. Ltd.
 LeelaConstates Pvt. Ltd.
 Leelarealcon Pvt. Ltd.
 Leela IT Projects Pvt. Ltd.
 Leela Lace Builders Pvt. Ltd.
 Leela Techno Parks Pvt. Ltd

References

Further reading
 C. P. Krishnan Nair
 The Leela Palaces, Hotels and Resorts

Conglomerate companies of India
Companies listed on the National Stock Exchange of India
Companies listed on the Bombay Stock Exchange